José López Rega (17 November 1916 – 9 June 1989) was an Argentine politician who served as Minister of Social Welfare from 1973 to 1975, first under Juan Perón and continuing under Isabel Perón, Juan Perón's third wife and presidential successor. Lopez Rega exercised Rasputin-like authority over Isabel Perón during her presidency, and used his influence and unique access to become the de facto ruler of Argentina. His orthodox peronist and far-right politics and interest in the occult earned him the nickname  El Brujo ("the Warlock"). Rega had one daughter, Norma Beatriz, who went on to become the spouse of President Raúl Lastiri.

Biography

Early life
López Rega's mother died giving birth to him in Buenos Aires. According to his biography by Marcelo Larraquy (2002), he was a respectful, introverted boy, who had a library covering an entire wall and a special interest in spiritual topics (which would later turn into a passion for esoterism and occultism). He married at the age of 27. In 1944 he joined the Federal Police; with the help of police chief Filomeno Velazco he joined the guard which protected the Casa Rosada, seat of the executive, with the rank of corporal.

In 1951, he met Victoria Montero who introduced him in the subject of esoterism. López Rega was a frequent visitor in Montero's home, where he met members of the freemasons organization. A common interest for esoterism linked him to Isabel, Perón's third wife, in 1965. (Evidently, Rega's esotericism included the writings of Alice Bailey:  "Also found in his [Rega's] home were 12 volumes by Alice Bailey on telepathy and Cosmic Fire...")  Sent to Argentina by Perón, exiled in Spain since the 1955 "Revolución Libertadora" coup, she organized a meeting in the house of major Bernardo Alberte, Perón's delegate and sponsor of various left-wing Peronist movement, among which the CGT de los Argentinos, a labor union federation which, between 1968 and 1972, gathered opponents to a pact with Juan Carlos Onganía's dictatorship, and which had an important role in the 1969 Cordobazo insurrection. After winning Isabel's trust, López Rega traveled to Spain, where he worked first for Perón's security before becoming the couple's personal secretary.

Allegiance with Perón
When Héctor José Cámpora was elected president on 11 March 1973, for the first general elections since 1963, as Perón's stand-in since the latter was forbidden from running himself, José López Rega, sent by Perón, became Minister of Social Welfare. From there, he opposed himself to Esteban Righi and others representatives of the Peronist left-wing. Perón returned to Argentina on 20 June 1973, acclaimed by the masses. The Ezeiza massacre, organized by López Rega on the day of Perón's return from an 18-year exile, led to a definitive split between left and right-wing Peronism, with Cámpora as representative of the left-wing and López Rega as representative of the right-wing. López Rega had positioned snipers under Perón's stage, who opened up fire upon the masses and the left-wing Peronist organizations, such as the Montoneros, etc. On the following days, Mario Roberto Santucho, leader of the Guevarist Ejército Revolucionario del Pueblo (ERP), held a press conference during which he accused López Rega and Colonel José Manuel Osinde of the massacre. Perón and López Rega, who, while in Spain, had supported left-wing Peronists, strongly criticized them this time around. López Rega openly criticized president Cámpora's position during the cabinet's meeting. After finding out about Perón's meeting with José Ignacio Rucci and other right-wing CGT leaders and also with the Army, Cámpora and his vice-president Vicente Solano Lima resigned. All of Cámpora's followers were sacked from all government positions, and López Rega's son-in-law, Raúl Alberto Lastiri, also a member of P2, became interim president and organized the elections. On 23 September 1973, Perón won them with almost 62% of the votes, naming his third wife Isabel Perón as vice-president.

Beside Raúl Lastiri's interim presidency, López Rega's success in the expulsion of the left-wing Peronists from power was confirmed on 4 August 1973, during the National Congress of Perón's Justicialist Party, with the nomination of his protector Isabel as candidate for vice-presidency. On 23 September, the Perón-Perón ticket won comfortably, with 61.85% of the votes. Troubled by the right-wing shift of Peronism and of the government, the Montoneros, a left-wing Peronist group, assassinated CGT's leader José Ignacio Rucci on 25 September  1973. The latter had also been involved in the creation of the Triple A (Alianza Argentina Anticomunista — Argentine Anticommunist Alliance). This assassination gave a pretext to López Rega to decree the prohibition of all armed groups and the closure of El Mundo, a left-wing newspaper. On 21 November 1973, radical senator Hipólito Solari Yrigoyen was seriously injured in the first terrorist attack claimed by the Triple A. Federal Police Chief Rodolfo Almirón had been suspected of organizing this attack.

Role in the government
Among Juan Perón's first actions after taking office were tougher sentences against "sedition" and "subversion". Started after the Ezeiza massacre, the split with the Peronist left-wing became even more visible with the resignation of eight deputies belonging to the Juventud Peronista (Peronist Youth). When Perón died on 1 July 1974, Isabel assumed power and López Rega became a sort of Prime minister, assuming the direction of all ministries in the Presidency's orbit. He decided almost by himself on the composition of the new cabinet, keeping for himself the title of Minister of Social Welfare. He was promoted to Comisario General, the highest rank in the Federal Police; he had reached the rank of corporal when a member of the police force.

As Isabel Perón's Minister of Social Welfare, López Rega conducted an unpopular policy of fiscal conservatism. In 1975 his protégé Celestino Rodrigo, Minister of Economy, devalued the Argentine peso by 50%, causing massive economic havoc, inflation, loss of savings, and general hardship on the middle and lower classes (in particular, public employees and retirees). López Rega came under attack from the leftist factions of the Peronist Party, accused of being a counter-revolutionary and a fascist.

In July 1975 he was formally accused by the main party organ of instigating the action of the Argentine Anti-Communist Alliance (Triple A). A terrorist group organized with his other protégé Rodolfo Almirón and funded by the Ministry of Social Welfare, this death squad was responsible for the death of 1,500 people and the exile of hundreds more. Starting with the 20 June 1973 Ezeiza massacre, it initiated the "Dirty War" in Argentina which was later taken over by Jorge Videla's junta (1976–83) during which around 30,000 people were "disappeared" (the Argentinian army acknowledged 22,000 disappearances between 1975 and 1979  8000 more in 5 years are a conservative guess).

Under heavy criticism due to Celestino Rodrigo's economic policies, López Rega was forced to resign on 11 July 1975; he was hurriedly appointed ambassador to Spain by Isabel Perón and fled to Franco's Spain with Rodolfo Almirón; Almirón later became the chief of security of Manuel Fraga, leader of the People's Alliance post-Franco conservative party, but was arrested in Spain in December 2006.

Fall and final years
On 24 March 1976, President Isabel Perón was deposed by the military Junta, which in turn organized the so-called "National Reorganization Process" and generalized the "Dirty War". López Rega spent the following ten years fleeing prosecution abroad, leaving Spain for Switzerland, where he lived near Geneva until 1982. Discovered by a photographer, he then fled to the Bahamas. He lived between Miami and the Bahamas until 1986, when he was arrested in the United States while trying to renew his passport, and extradited to Argentina, where he was wanted for corruption, conspiracy, and multiple homicides. He died of diabetes on 9 June 1989 in Buenos Aires, while awaiting trial in prison.

In film
In the 2013 film Puerta de Hierro, el exilio de Perón, Fito Yanelli plays López Rega during Perón's exile in Madrid.
López Rega is dismissed by Perón but allowed back because of his wife's intercession.

References

Sources

 Biography of José López Rega (in Spanish)
 López Rega. La biografía. Marcelo Larraquy. Editorial Sudamericana. 473 pages. .
 Bra, Gerardo, "La 'P-2- en la Argentina", in Félix Luna (ed) et al., Todo es historia, No. 214, Feb 1985, pp. 12–15

1916 births
1989 deaths
Ambassadors of Argentina to Spain
Argentine anti-communists
Argentine expatriates in Switzerland
Argentine people of Spanish descent
Argentine people who died in prison custody
Argentine politicians convicted of crimes
Deaths from diabetes
Justicialist Party politicians
Ministers of social welfare of Argentina
Operatives of Operation Condor
People from Buenos Aires
Prisoners who died in Argentine detention